Eudonia oculata is a moth in the family Crambidae. It was described by Alfred Philpott in 1927. This species is endemic to New Zealand.

The wingspan is 19–22 mm. The forewings are dull purplish-brown with a blackish reniform spot. The hindwings are fuscous-grey. Adults have been recorded on wing in February, April and November.

References

Moths described in 1927
Eudonia
Moths of New Zealand
Endemic fauna of New Zealand
Endemic moths of New Zealand